Selina Lo (born 29 January 1994) is a British actress. She is known for roles in films including ‘Guan Yin’ in Joe Carnahan's Boss Level, and ‘The Gasp’ in David Bruckner's Hellraiser. She will also appear in season 2 of Lord of the Rings: The Rings of Power.

Early life
Lo is of Chinese descent. In addition to performing, Lo was interested in martial arts growing up. She gave up the hobby after a knee injury. She trained in acting at the Sylvia Young Theatre School and the Liverpool Institute for Performing Arts (LIPA).

Filmography

Awards and nominations

References

External links

 

Living people
1991 births
Alumni of the Liverpool Institute for Performing Arts
Alumni of the Sylvia Young Theatre School
British actresses of Chinese descent
British film actresses
British female kickboxers